Adrian Dunbar (born 1 August 1958) is a Northern Irish actor, director and singer, known for his television and his theatre work. Dunbar co-wrote and starred in the 1991 film Hear My Song, nominated for Best Original Screenplay at the BAFTA awards.

Since 2012, he has played Superintendent Ted Hastings in all six series of BBC Television's Line of Duty. He has appeared as Alan Cox in The Jump, Martin Summers in Ashes to Ashes, Richard Plantagenet in The Hollow Crown, and as Father Flaherty in Broken. Dunbar also stars in the lead role of DI Ridley in the 2022 police procedural crime series Ridley, of which he was also associate producer.

Early life
Dunbar was born and brought up in Enniskillen, County Fermanagh, in Northern Ireland, the eldest of seven siblings. He was educated at St Joseph's College, Enniskillen before attending the Guildhall School of Music and Drama in London.

Career
Dunbar has appeared in such notable films as My Left Foot, The Crying Game and The General. He has also had leading roles in the films Triggermen, Shooters, How Harry Became A Tree (with Colm Meaney), Richard III and Widows' Peak.

On television he starred in the first episode of Cracker, giving a performance as an innocent murder suspect with amnesia, and also the last episode of A Touch of Frost. He has been in many British productions, including Tough Love, Inspector Morse, Kidnapped, Murphy's Law, Murder in Mind, Ashes to Ashes and the 2005 re-staging of The Quatermass Experiment.

Dunbar's theatre credits include The Shaughraun and Exiles at Dublin's Abbey Theatre; Real Dreams and The Danton Affair at the Royal Shakespeare Company; King Lear, Pope's Wedding, Saved and Up to the Sun And Down to the Centre at Royal Court Theatre and Conversations on a Homecoming at the Lyric Theatre in Belfast; A Trinity of Two (as Oscar Wilde) at Dublin's Liberty Hall Theatre; and Boeing Boeing (London, 2007). He has directed a critically acclaimed production of Philadelphia Here I Come!.

In 2008 he starred in and co-directed Brendan at the Chelsea by Janet Behan, playing Brendan Behan. The play was the first to be staged in the Naughton Studio in the new Lyric Theatre in Belfast after it reopened in 2011, and was revived for a tour to Theatre Row in New York in September 2013.

Dunbar played the role of Tullus Aufidius in the BBC radio production of Coriolanus. He also made a guest appearance in the BBC Radio 4 series Baldi, and appeared on stage as Vermeer in an adaptation of Girl with a pearl earring.

In 2008 Dunbar played the role of Philip Conolly in the critically acclaimed The Last Confession of Alexander Pearce. He starred alongside fellow Northern Irish actor Ciarán McMenamin in the remote rain-forests of north west Tasmania. He joined the cast of the  police procedural television series Line of Duty in 2012, portraying the role of Superintendent Ted Hastings; he continued in this role for all subsequent series.

Dunbar is also a theatre director who staged productions for the Happy Days Enniskillen International Beckett Festival.

He played the mysterious character Martin Summers in the second series of Ashes to Ashes. In 2014 he played the title character in a BBC comedy drama Walter.

Dunbar also starred as Jim Hogan on the Virgin Media Television original drama Blood.

Other media
He was cast as Bail Organa for Star Wars: Episode I – The Phantom Menace and appeared in costume in publicity stills, but his scene was cut; the character was re-cast with Jimmy Smits for later films. Dunbar's likeness was retconned into the appearance of the character Bail Antilles.
He fronts his own band, which has played in such American locations as Nashville, Tennessee and Austin, Texas.
He sings "The Curragh of Kildare" with Brian Kennedy on Kennedy's On Song, and fronts this song with his own band.
He narrates the popular TV series The Estate as well as an audiobook production of Eoin Colfer's novel Artemis Fowl.
He played a minor role in The Dawning (1988), alongside Anthony Hopkins and Hugh Grant, which led to further early roles in his acting career.

Awards and nominations

BAFTA Awards

Irish Film & Television Academy Awards

National Television Awards

TV Choice Awards

GQ Men of the Year Awards

Personal life
Dunbar has a daughter and stepson from his 1986 marriage to Australian actress Anna Nygh. He lives in Crouch End, North London. He received an honorary degree of Doctor of Letters from the University of Ulster in June 2009 in recognition of his services to acting.

Filmography

Film

Television

References

External links

1958 births
Living people
People from Enniskillen
Alumni of the Guildhall School of Music and Drama
20th-century Irish male actors
21st-century Irish male actors
Male stage actors from Northern Ireland
Male television actors from Northern Ireland
Male film actors from Northern Ireland